Sabrina Victoria D'Angelo (born May 11, 1993) is a Canadian professional soccer player who plays as a goalkeeper for Women's Super League club Arsenal and the Canada national team. D'Angelo was selected 21st overall in the 2015 NWSL College Draft by the Western New York Flash and is one of the few Canadian soccer players drafted directly from college.

Early life
D'Angelo was born to Gerry and Bonnie D'Angelo in Welland, Ontario. She has an older brother, Derek. Growing up, D'Angelo took part in both dancing and soccer, as well as many other sports teams at school. D'Angelo attended Notre Dame College School in Welland, ON.

College career
D'Angelo attended the University of South Carolina, where she played for the Gamecocks from 2011 to 2014.

In the 2011 season, D'Angelo started 20 of South Carolina's 21 matches and lead the SEC in goals against average (0.80) and was second in save percentage (0.824) for all matches. After just one season, she ranked all-time second in career goals against average at South Carolina. For 2011, D'Angelo was awarded numerous honours for the season, including SEC Co-Defensive Player of the Year, SEC Freshman of the Year, and SEC Goalkeeper of the Year, and she was the only freshman goalkeeper in the nation to make an All-Region team.

In 2012, D'Angelo started 16 of 17 matches after missing the first four games of the season while paying for the Canadian U-20 team at the U-20 Women's World Cup. D'Angelo only allowed 21 goals all season and recorded 55 saves. By the end of the season, she ranked third all-time in South Carolina history in career saves with 130.

D'Angelo started all 23 games for South Carolina in 2013 and recorded the second most shutouts in a season in school history with 12, seven of those in the first eight games of the season. She recorded 0.59 goals against average and 57 saves. She was a semifinalist for the MAC Hermann Trophy for 2013. She was also given NSCAA First Team All-America honours and NSCAA First Team All-South Region honours. She was also named SEC Defensive Player of the Year for the second time in her career.

D'Angelo was named team captain for the 2014 season and started 22 games before she injured her wrist, which kept her out of the net for the final three games of the season. She posted 10 shutouts, 54 saves, and a 0.58 goals against average. After her wrist injury, she logged minutes as a field player for two games.

Club career

Western New York Flash
D'Angelo was selected 21st overall by the Western New York Flash of the National Women's Soccer League in the third round of the 2015 NWSL College Draft on January 16, 2015. She was signed as a drafted player and made seven starts in seven appearances for the Flash in 2015, allowing 11 goals.

On February 8, 2016, it was announced that D'Angelo would be allocated by the Canadian Soccer Association for the 2016 NWSL Season.

On May 21, 2016 D'Angelo broke her left wrist during warmups before a game between the Western New York Flash and Sky Blue FC; however, she still played all 90 minutes of the game. She had surgery to repair her wrist on June 3 and was optimistic that she would recover quickly. She made six appearances for the Flash before she was injured.

D'Angelo was named the 2016 NWSL Championship MVP as she made 3 saves during the penalty shootout, leading the Western New York Flash to the 2016 NWSL Championship.

North Carolina Courage
On January 9, 2017 the Western New York Flash became the North Carolina Courage as the team was sold and relocated to Cary, North Carolina. D'Angelo began the 2017 season as North Carolina's number one keeper, as she started seven of their first eight games. After that her playing time was very limited as Katelyn Rowland took over as North Carolina's number one keeper.

In 2018 D'Angelo was once again behind Rowland on North Carolina's depth chart, as she only played in seven regular season games. The Courage participated in the inaugural Women's International Champions Cup in July 2018. D'Angelo started in goal in the Championship Game and held Olympique Lyonnais scoreless as North Carolina won 1–0.

in the 2018 Play-offs, D'Angelo started North Carolina's semi-final game against the Chicago Red Stars as Rowland was recovering from a concussion. She recorded a shutout as the Courage won 2–0, and advanced to their second straight championship game.

Vittsjö GIK
After four seasons in the NWSL, D'Angelo would sign with Damallsvenskan club Vittsjö GIK in December 2018.

Arsenal
In January 2023, D'Angelo joined English Women's Super League club Arsenal. She made her debut for the club on 26 January, playing the full quarterfinals game against Aston Villa in the FA Women's League Cup.

International career

Youth teams
D'Angelo was first called up to the Canada Women's U-17 team in June 2007 for a nine-day training camp in Ottawa when she was 14.

In July 2008, D'Angelo was named to the roster for the first 2008 CONCACAF Women's Under-17 Championship in Trinidad and Tobago; however, she made no appearance for the team during the tournament. Canada's third-place finish in the tournament gave them a spot in the inaugural FIFA U-17 Women's World Cup in October. D'Angelo was named to the roster for the U-17 World Cup, but once again made no appearance for the team.

D'Angelo made her first appearance for the U-17 team in March 2010 during the CONCACAF Women's Under-17 Championship in Costa Rica. She started all five of Canada's matches in the tournament, recording two shutouts and helping Canada win their first championship title and qualify for the 2010 FIFA U-17 Women's World Cup in Trinidad and Tobago. In September 2010, D'Angelo started all three of Canada's matches in the U-17 Women's World Cup, recording a shutout against Ghana.

Following an impressive showing at the U-17 Women's World Cup, D'Angelo was called up to train with the full Canadian national team in October 2010. Following the training camp, she was named to the roster for the Torneio Internacional Cidade de São Paulo that took place in December 2010, but made no appearance.

In 2012, D'Angelo made the transition to the U-20 team and was named to the roster for the 2012 CONCACAF Women's Under-20 Championship in March. D'Angelo started in all five of Canada's matches of the tournament. Canada won the silver medal and qualified for the 2012 FIFA U-20 Women's World Cup in Japan. D'Angelo was on the roster for the World Cup in August and started in all three of Canada's matches in the tournament; however, Canada came in 11th place. Following the tournament, D'Angelo was named 2012 Canadian U-20 Player of the Year.

In February 2013, D'Angelo was named to the 23-player squad of potential Canada's Women's National Team players for the first EXCELeration camp that took place in Florida.

Senior team
D'Angelo finally made the transition to the full Canada Women's National Team in December 2015, when she was called up to train with the team. She was then named to the roster for the 2016 CONCACAF Women's Olympic Qualifying Tournament in February, although she made no appearances.

D'Angelo made her first appearance for the national team on March 4, 2016 during the Algarve Cup in Portugal against Belgium. She posted a clean sheet for the match. She made one other appearance during the tournament on March 9, coming in for Stephanie Labbé in the 46th minute.

Following a major injury of Canada's starting goalkeeper, Erin McLeod, in March 2016, D'Angelo was named to the roster for the 2016 Rio Olympics. At the 2016 Olympics D'Angelo appeared in one game in goal for Canada, as she was the back-up keeper behind Stephanie Labbé. Canada would go on to win the bronze medal.

D'Angelo appeared in two matches for Canada in 2017. She has received fewer call-ups since 2016 as former starting keeper Erin McLeod has recovered from injury, and has assumed the back-up role behind Labbé.  On May 25, 2019 D'Angelo was named to the roster for the 2019 FIFA Women's World Cup.

Career statistics

Club

Honours
Western New York Flash
NWSL Champions: 2016
North Carolina Courage
NWSL Champions: 2018
NWSL Shield: 2017, 2018
Canada
 Summer Olympics bronze medal: 2016
Individual
 NWSL Finals Most Valuable Player: 2016
Canadian U-20 Female Player of the Year: 2012
NSCAA First-Team All-South Region: 2011, 2013, 2014
NSCAA First-Team All-America: 2013, 2014
 NSCAA First-Team Scholar All-America: 2013, 2014
 SEC Defensive Player of the Year: 2011, 2013
 SEC Freshman of the Year: 2011
 First-Team All-SEC: 2011, 2013, 2014
 Second-Team All-SEC: 2012
SEC All-Freshman Team: 2011
 SEC All-Tournament Team: 2013
 Soccer America All-Freshman First Team: 2011
Soccer America MVPs Second Team: 2013
Capital One Academic All-America First Team: 2014
 Capital One All-District Team: 2014
President's Award: 2014
TopDrawerSoccer Best XI First Team: 2013

References

External links

1993 births
Living people
Canadian women's soccer players
Canadian people of Italian descent
USL W-League (1995–2015) players
National Women's Soccer League players
Western New York Flash players
Sportspeople from Welland
Women's association football goalkeepers
South Carolina Gamecocks women's soccer players
Canadian expatriate sportspeople in the United States
Expatriate women's soccer players in the United States
Footballers at the 2016 Summer Olympics
Olympic soccer players of Canada
Olympic bronze medalists for Canada
Olympic medalists in football
Medalists at the 2016 Summer Olympics
Canada women's international soccer players
Western New York Flash draft picks
North Carolina Courage players
2019 FIFA Women's World Cup players
Damallsvenskan players
Vittsjö GIK players
Arsenal W.F.C. players
Canadian expatriate sportspeople in England
Expatriate women's footballers in England